Joseph Verria is an American football coach.  He has been the head football coach at the Bridgewater State University in Bridgewater, Massachusetts since 2016.

A star player at Bridgewater State for head coach Peter Mazzaferro from 1976 to 1979, Verria spent time on the preseason rosters of several National Football League teams, including the Green Bay Packers under head coach Bart Starr in 1980, the Cincinnati Bengals under head coach Forrest Gregg in 1981, the Miami Dolphins under head coach Don Shula in 1982, and the New England Patriots under head coach Ron Meyer in 1983.

Head coaching record

College

References

External links
 Bridgewater State profile

Year of birth missing (living people)
Living people
American football defensive tackles
Bridgewater State Bears football coaches
Bridgewater State Bears football players
High school football coaches in Massachusetts